The Westmeath Senior Hurling Championship (known for sponsorship reasons as Slevin Coaches Senior Hurling Championship and abbreviated to the Westmeath SHC) is an annual hurling competition organized by the Westmeath County Board of the Gaelic Athletic Association and contested by the top-ranking senior clubs in the county of Westmeath in Ireland. It is the most prestigious competition in Westmeath hurling.

The competition has been won by 19 teams, 14 of which have won it more than once. Clonkill is the most successful team in the championship's history, having won it 17 times. Castletown Geoghegan are the reigning champions, defeating Clonkill by 0–22 to 1–14 in the 2022 Westmeath SHC final.

Current senior teams
The 12 clubs that will compete in the 2023 Westmeath Senior Hurling Championship are:

Brownstown, Castletown Geoghegan, Castlepollard, Clonkill, Crookedwood, Cullion, Delvin, Fr. Daltons, Lough Lene Gaels, Raharney, Ringtown, and St. Oliver Plunketts.

Senior hurling in Westmeath is divided into two separate groups. Group A; Castletown Geoghegan, Castlepollard, Clonkill, Fr. Daltons, Lough Lene Gaels, and Raharney. Group B; Brownstown, Cullion, Crookedwood, Delvin, St Oliver Plunketts, and Ringtown.

The team finishing lowest in Group A is relegated to Group B, the team finishing lowest in Group B is relegated to the Westmeath Intermediate Hurling Championship for the following season.

Top winners

Roll of honour

References

External links
Official Westmeath Website
Westmeath on Hoganstand
Westmeath Club GAA
Lough Lene Gaels

 
1
Senior hurling county championships